The 2010–11 season of Parma F.C. was Parma's 20th season and 2nd consecutive season in Serie A, having finished in 8th position in the previous season. The club was embroiled in a relegation dogfight for much of the season, but managed to secure their place in Serie A for the following year on 8 May with two games to spare. As well as competing in Serie A as one of twenty teams, Parma took part in the 2010–11 edition of the Coppa Italia but were eliminated by Palermo at the quarter-final stage. Parma started the season with a new head coach after Francesco Guidolin resigned from the post in late May as he was appointed by Udinese. His successor, Pasquale Marino, who was also Guidolin's predecessor at Udinese, was announced as head coach on 2 June 2010, but was sacked with seven games of the season left on 3 April 2011. He was replaced by Franco Colomba two days later. Colomba's arrival brought about a dramatic improvement in results and led to what turned out to be comfortably achieved safety.

Kits

|
|
|
|
|
|

Pre-season

Results
Kick-off times are in CET.

Serie A

Summary
Without injured Daniele Galloppa, who was ruled out until the new year, Parma opened their season on the last Sunday of August with 2–0 victory over newly promoted Brescia. Valeri Bojinov opened the scoring after just ten minutes when, having played a short pass to débutant Sebastian Giovinco on the edge of the box, was returned the ball after a chipped Giovinco ball over the defence, which beat the offside trap and left the previous season's top scorer Bojinov through on goal. The second goal came on the stroke of half-time through Stefano Morrone, who was left a simple tap-in after a far post header from Alessandro Lucarelli off a lofted free-kick set him up. Parma's second league game of the season involved a trip off the mainland to Catania, where a goal in either half saw off Parma's challenge despite a late goal from Giovinco, but the match ended in regrettable style as Lucarelli was given his marching orders for a second yellow card. Parma then secured consecutive 1–1 draws, first at home to Genoa and then away to Lecce, in very similar fashion as the opposition took the lead through a first-half penalty before Parma drew level halfway through the second half. Two difficult games – away to Fiorentina and at home to A.C. Milan – ended in defeat as Parma slipped into the relegation zone with two- and one-goal reverses respectively, the latter after a spectacular 30-yard strike from Andrea Pirlo. Remarkably, Parma gave away a penalty for four consecutive matches before the run was ended against Milan. Parma went rock-bottom in Serie A after their seventh league game and a 1–1 draw against Cesena as Cristian Zaccardo scored his second league goal of the season, despite having the better of the match. Consecutive goalless draws at home to Roma and Chievo lifted the club out of the relegation zone but prompted sporting director Pietro Leonardi to offer public support to head coach Pasquale Marino. Bizarrely, in the lead-up to the Roma match on 24 October, Parma's fans protested against the lunchtime kick-off by the simultaneous consumption of sandwiches. 

Parma then slipped back to eighteenth position after an Edinson Cavani brace saw Napoli comfortably overcome a Parma side without a win since the opening day of the season, which led to president Tommaso Ghirardi demanding improvement. Parma then beat Sampdoria at home in thick fog and A.S. Bari away by a solitary goal to nil to shoot up to fourteenth position and ease pressure on Marino, the latter including a wonderful goal from Antonio Candreva. Parma secured a respectable draw at home to early season pace-setters Lazio the next week as ex-Lazio star Hernán Crespo opened the scoring for Parma, netting his 65th league goal for the club, before Luca Antonelli's own goal cancelled it out on the stroke of half-time. Next up were reigning champions Internazionale who beat Parma by five goals to two, overcoming an early Hernán Crespo brace, who was again scoring against former employers. The Argentinian striker was again on the scoresheet the following week as former manager Francesco Guidolin returned to Il Tardini for the first time since his summer departure, opening the scoring from the penalty spot with 24 minutes played before Udinese's Antonio Di Natale equalised 11 minutes later. Crespo then put his team back in front for good early in the second half as Parma won 2-1 and scoring his 150th Serie goal. The following week, Parma travelled to Palermo and took the lead inside ten minutes as Alessandro Lucarelli found the net. Parma then surrendered their lead and three second half goals from the Rosanero were enough to see Parma off and the match finished 3–1. The Ducali rounded off their pre-Christmas schedule with home match against rivals Bologna, who proved to be stubborn opposition in a goalless draw.

Parma started 2011 in perfect fashion, overcoming biggest rivals Juventus away from home by a scoreline of four goals to one in the Turin club's first sell-out of the season. Juventus' Felipe Melo was sent off early on before two goals from Juve loanee Giovinco, a penalty from Crespo and a late goal from new signing (co-owned by Juve) Raffaele Palladino were bisected by a Legrottaglie header. A disappointing result followed as Parma succumbed to a home defeat, conceding goals five and six of the season at home as they went down by two goals to one to Cagliari. Long-serving defender Massimo Paci was given his marching orders in the first half of the following match away to Brescia as Parma lost by two goals to nil. After two straight defeats, Parma then returned to winning ways with a two-nil victory over Catania after second half goals from Candreva and Giovinco within minutes of each other. Two straight defeats followed, firstly 3–1 away to Genoa, whom Parma helped to their first home win since November as an early penalty was cancelled out by a Crespo strike, but atoned for by a Paletta own goal and a close-range Kaladze goal on the stroke of half-time, and secondly 1–0 at home to fellow strugglers Lecce at the start of February in a match which Parma dominated but lost in injury time. The losing run was halted the next week as Parma hosted Fiorentina and a first goal for winter transfer window loan signing Amauri scored. His goal was cancelled out by a second half penalty and the match ended one apiece. Parma were then handed a four-nil thrashing by league leaders Milan, extending Parma's winless streak to four matches Parma's next match was a relegation dogfight against Cesena. In an eventful ninety minutes, Parma came from behind twice to draw the match two-all. Parma then travelled to the Stadio Olimpico to face Roma and gave away a penalty and a goal from a corner to trail by two goals at half-time. A second-half Amauri brace saw Parma level the scoreline and the match finished 2–2. As pressure grew on head coach Pasquale Marino, a third consecutive draw followed; this time it a goalless draw away to Chievo. Gabriel Paletta was sent off late in the second half in an otherwise uneventful affair.

Parma's dismal winless run extended to 8 games as they lost to Napoli by three goals to one. Parma opened the scoring through Raffaele Palladino, but Napoli hit back with three goals in a second half that yet again saw a Parma player sent off; this time it was Daniele Galloppa. Parma finally ended their winless streak and boosted their survival chances on 20 March 2011, overcoming fellow relegation battlers Sampdoria with a solitary goal midway through the second half. The following week, a 2–1 defeat at home to Bari in a match that Parma dominated was enough to see head coach Pasquale Marino lose his job with Parma two points clear of the relegation zone. He was replaced by Franco Colomba, who was signed on a 14-month deal and had been out of a job since the previous summer, two days later. Colomba's first match in charge, a tricky trip to Rome to face Champions League qualification-chasing Lazio ended in defeat by two goals to nil, a goal coming in each half. On 16 April, national and continental and world champions Internazionale paid a visit to the Tardini, as Parma recorded a historic two-goal victory with goals from Juventus loanees Giovinco and Amauri. The next week, a second consecutive 2–0 win – their first in Udine since 2001 – over ten-man Udinese thanks to two Amauri goals boosted Parma's chances of salvation, but other relegation candidates' result meant the club remained just three points clear of the relegation zone. Parma faced Europe-chasing Palermo on 1 May and recorded yet another win at home. Two early first-half goals saw Parma lead 2–0 before a second half Palermo goal put Parma on edge. Two minutes from time, Antonio Candreva restored Parma's two-goal lead and confirmed Parma's first three-game winning streak of the season. Six points clear of the relegation zone with just three games remaining, Parma looked to have secured their participation in Serie A for the following season. Parma then travelled to meet Bologna in the Emilian Derby the following weekend, with both sides knowing that three points would secure their Serie A status for the season to come. The match ended goalless and results in other matches meant that relegation could not be ruled out at the final whistle, but a late goal in a later game saw Genoa defeat Sampdoria in the Derby della Lanterna, confirming Parma's place in next year's Serie A. Parma celebrated their safety in style in the Stadio Ennio Tardini the week after with a win over injury-hit bitterest rivals Juventus, the only goal of the game coming from the man on loan from Juventus, Sebastian Giovinco, who had scored two goals in the reverse fixture and secured Colomba's fourth win in six games. The season ended in a low-key affair away to Cagliari. Valeri Bojinov opened the scoring for Parma before a Rolf Feltscher own goal levelled the scoreline, as Parma finished the league season in twelfth position.

Results
Kick-off times are in CET.

Statistics

Standings

Pld = Matches played; W = Matches won; D = Matches drawn; L = Matches lost; F = Goals for; A = Goals against; GD = Goal difference; Pts = Points

Results summary

Pld = Matches played; W = Matches won; D = Matches drawn; L = Matches lost; F = Goals for; A = Goals against; GD = Goal difference; Pts = Points

Results by round

Coppa Italia

Summary
Parma entered the competition at the Round of 16 as the rules of the tournament dictated that, alongside those teams which qualified for Europe for the 2010–11 season, the highest finisher in Serie A who failed to qualify for European football would begin competing at that advanced stage. As the entirety of the tournament is pre-drawn, Parma knew the identity of the ten teams that would fight for the right to play away at the Ennio Tardini in the Round of 16 in the first four preliminary rounds. These were Santegidiese, Trapani, AlzanoCene, Reggiana, SPAL, Alessandria, all of whom competed from the First Round; Reggina, Frosinone, Empoli, all of whom competed from the Second Round; and Fiorentina, who competed from the Third Round. It transpired that Fiorentina – the only Serie A team in the section – emerged as Parma's opponents. The match remained goalless for 114 minutes until Fiorentina broke the deadlock through Mario Santana. Crespo equalised for Parma just a minute later and then scored another three minutes from time to take Parma through to the quarter-finals, where they faced Palermo away from home in the last week of January. The sides played out 120 minutes of goalless football before Palermo emerged victorious in a penalty shoot-out as Francesco Valiani missed the decisive penalty.

Results
Kick-off times are in CET.

Player statistics

Transfers
Parma's first major moves of the summer transfer window came in quick succession, signing previous season loanee and striker Valeri Bojinov from Manchester City, who revealed he had turned down an approach from Sevilla, and central defender Gabriel Paletta from Boca Juniors in the space of two days. Spaniard Fernando Marqués also arrived for an undisclosed fee from Espanyol. Midfielders Sebastian Giovinco and Massimo Gobbi both signed for Parma at the start of August on a loan deal from Juventus and on a free transfer from Fiorentina respectively, as did Danilo Pereira from Benfica. Journeyman forward Cristiano Lucarelli signed on loan for Napoli after he was told he was surplus to requirements at Parma, while experienced defender Christian Panucci retired at the age of thirty-seven. Parma ended the transfer window by signing Italian World Cup squad member Antonio Candreva on loan from Udinese for the duration of the season.

Business in the winter transfer window started early as full ownership of Italian international left-back Luca Antonelli and Parma's half-share in Alberto Paloschi were both transferred to Genoa. In return Genoa paid €7 million and exchanged the full ownership of Francesco Modesto and Genoa's share in Raffaele Palladino, who remained co-owned by Juventus. Parma also completed the loan signing of Toni Calvo from Greek UEFA Europa League entrants Aris with an option to make the move permanent in the summer. On deadline day, Parma signed Italian international Amauri from rivals Juventus on loan until the end of the season.

On 2 July 2010, the FIGC announced only one new non-EU signing from abroad could be registered, instead of two in previous season. They are marked yellow.

In

Out

Loan in

Loan out

See also
List of Parma F.C. seasons

References

2010-11
Italian football clubs 2010–11 season